Xenomigia consanguinea is a moth of the family Notodontidae. ItI occurs at upper elevations in the central Andes of Colombia.

It has a forewing length of 20–22 m, making it one of the largest described species in the genus Xenomigia.

References

Moths described in 1911
Notodontidae of South America